Oreste Albertini (28 March 1887 in Torre del Mangano – 7 July 1953 in Besano, Varese) was an Italian painter.

He first attended the Scuola Civica Pavese at Pavia, but at the age of 13 became an apprentice to the fresco artist Cesare Maroni. Together they frescoed the church of Besano in Varese. In 1910, he enrolled in night classes at the school of decoration at the Umanitaria of Milan and the Brera Academy, paying for his courses by decorative painting and working as a machinist at factories. In 1923, he exhibited at the Brera. By the 1930s he arranged to market his works through Giuseppe Zecchini in Milan. After some paintings experimenting with Divisionism, he began painting landscapes of the Dolomites and vedute of the Varesotto (urban areas of Varese).
 In 1938, he exhibited in Milan Cimon della pala-Dolomiti, a work characterized by an amplitude of segantiniana visual memory.

References

1887 births
1953 deaths
20th-century Italian painters
Italian male painters
Painters from Milan
Italian landscape painters
19th-century Italian male artists
20th-century Italian male artists